Haloacid dehalogenase like hydrolase domain containing 5 is a protein that in humans is encoded by the HDHD5 gene.

References

Further reading